Rebecca Greiner (born 13 June 1999) is an Australian field hockey player.

Personal life
Greiner was a student at St. Luke's Anglican College in Bundaberg, Queensland.

Her favourite food is currently her mother's infamous 'Christmas Rumballs'.

Greiner plays national hockey for her home state Queensland in the Australian Hockey League. In the 2018 AHL, Greiner was equal highest goalscorer.

Career

Junior
Greiner was a member of the Australian women's junior national team 'The Jillaroos' that won bronze at the 2016 Hockey Junior World Cup in Chile.

In 2017, Greiner represented the Australia U23 team in a tour of Europe.

Senior
Greiner made her senior international debut in November 2018 at the Hockey Champions Trophy, held in Changzhou, China.

International Goals

References

External links
 
 
 

1999 births
Living people
Australian female field hockey players
Sportspeople from Bundaberg
20th-century Australian women
21st-century Australian women
Field hockey players at the 2022 Commonwealth Games
Sportswomen from Queensland
Commonwealth Games silver medallists for Australia
Commonwealth Games medallists in field hockey
Medallists at the 2022 Commonwealth Games